Hon. John Dorsey (before 1646 – 1714) was a colonial settler of Maryland and Anne Arundel County, the youngest son of Edward the Shipwright. He and his brothers Edward and Joshua  patented "Hockley-in-the-Hole" on the south side of the Severn in 1664. He acquired Troy in 1699.

John also owned Dorsey's Search.

References

People of colonial Maryland
People from Anne Arundel County, Maryland
1640s births
1714 deaths
American people of English descent
Dorsey family of Maryland